The Sixth Lie (stylized as THE SIXTH LIE) is a Japanese electronic rock band formed in May 2015 in Tokyo, Japan. Their music is known for its hybrid style inspired by the latest western music, and their overall science fiction-inspired theme connected to near future and outer space.

They held their first world tour from June 2017, which gathered 2,500 visitors and resulted in sold out CD's at venues.

Members
Arata (Vocal)
 Likes both Japanese and western EDM and rock, and is familiar with music of many different genres. He is known for clear vocals with a vocal range of 3 octaves. He was responsible for composing the band's initial songs. He was focused in football during elementary school and junior high school, and was an athlete aiming for Hakone Ekiden with long-distance running. At times he plays the keyboard during their shows.
 When he joined the band, Reiji and Ray invited him to a café, but he wanted them to listen to his singing, so he told them to meet him in a karaoke room. He says he doesn't remember this incident himself.
Reiji (Guitar, Programming, Keyboard)
He is in charge of composing and arranging all of their songs, with a hybrid sound that has been inspired by the latest western music as his weapon. One of the original members of the band from back when they were formed. He is known for his clean guitars with a lot of arpeggio, but also plays heavy riffs depending on songs.  During junior high school he played at Junior Olympics as the representative of Gunma Prefecture in volleyball. During high school he played at Inter-High School Championships as the representative of Gunma Prefecture. He also aimed for All-Japan Volley Ball High School Tournament, but unfortunately lost in the finals.  He used to be Japan's number one for smartphone game "AVABEL ONLINE". He won the Crash Royale section during “eSports Star League Battle Championship #1”, an eSports tournament for celebrities held on January 8, 2018.
Ray (Drums)
 He is in charge of the lyrics for all songs and the direction and editing of all of their music videos and live videos. He also makes videos for other artists. The CD covers are also designed by Ray.  He is currently second year student at a master's course in University of Tokyo, and he is studying drones and artificial intelligence. Together with Reiji, he is one of the original members of the band.  He likes progressive rock from the 70's, and you can see his interest in this genre from his drum phrases with a lot of action. During some songs he also plays synth drum pads, and with that makes a flower bloom to their electronic band sound.
Ryusei (Bass)
 Ryusei joined the group in 2018. He went to Paris for the first time when the sixth lie played to the Japan expo in 2019.

History
 2015
 Goes through a few member changes from the previous band, and gets their current formation.
 In November, they release the music video for "Wake Up Your Fire", and their futuristic sound and the music video directed and edited by Ray gains high praising from the music industry.
 2016
 They make a contract with euclid agency in May.
 They release their first album "INTEGRAL" on 7 September.
 Their first headlining show "LIVE INTEGRAL ver.1.0" is held at Shibuya CYCLONE on 16 October.
 They were selected to perform as the opening act for Slipknot's rock festival "Knotfest JAPAN 2016". They performed in front of 20,000 people together with Slipknot, Deftones, Disturbed, hoobastank, Issues, SiM, ROTTENGRAFFTY, Oldcodex, coldrain, Crystal Lake, and more.
 2017
 They released their second album "DIFFERENTIAL" on 25 January. The album gets highly praised due to the overall theme and artwork that are opposing the previous release. They gathered a lot of attention by taking over both sides of TOWER RECORS Shibuya Store escalators.
 They held a headlining show "LIVE DIFFERENTIAL ver.1.0" on 4 February.
 Released digital limited single "Go On" on 6 June. Their cover version of "Oh No" by Bring Me the Horizon was included as a coupling song.
 From their headlining show "LIVE TRIANGLE ver.1.0" on 10 June, they started their world tour "LIVE TRIANGLE", and toured Japan, United Kingdom, France, Germany and Canada. Despite it being their first overseas tour, there were a total of 2,500 visitors in the tour, and they sold out CD's at the venues.
 THE SIXTH LIE's bassist Hiroto to depart from band in December.

 2018
 They performed at ”Japan Expo Thailand" in Bangkok, Thailand on 27 and 28 January.
 Their third album "SINGularity" was released on 7 March.
 They performed the ending theme for the anime adaptation of Golden Kamuy, which will air in April 2018.
 Will be performing at Japan Expo in Paris, France in July.

Etymology 
The name of the band is a reference to the French composer Claude Debussy, who said: "Art is the most beautiful of all lies." The band's name is an indication of band's aim, "to create a lie so beautiful that it cannot be full experienced by the five senses".

Discography

Mini-Albums

Album

Single

Collaborations

Main Shows

Headlining Shows 
 2016/10/16 – Headlining Show "LIVE INTEGRAL ver.1.0" SHIBUYA CYCLONE
 2017/02/04 – Headlining Show "LIVE DIFFERENTIAL ver.1.0" SHIBUYA CYCLONE
 2017/06/10 – Headlining Show "LIVE TRIANGLE ver.1.0" SHIBUYA CYCLONE
 2018/02/03 – Headlining Show "LIVE SINGularity ver.1.0" Shibuya REX

Main Events 
 2016/11/05 – Knotfest JAPAN 2016 Opening Act
 2017/07/14 – Hyper Japan, London, United Kingdom
 2017/07/15 – Hyper Japan, London, United Kingdom
 2017/08/11 – Animethon, Edmonton, Canada
 2017/08/12 – Animethon, Edmonton, Canada
 2017/08/13 – Animethon, Edmonton, Canada
 2018/01/27 – Japan Expo Thailand, Bangkok, Thailand
 2018/01/28 – Japan Expo Thailand, Bangkok, Thailand
 2018/06/05 - Japan Expo France, Paris, France
 2019/06/04 - Japan Expo France, Paris, France
 2019/06/05 - Japan Expo France, Paris, France

References

External links 

 

Japanese rock music groups
Japanese electronic music groups
Musical groups established in 2015
Musical quartets
2015 establishments in Japan